The communauté de communes Campagne de Caux is located in the Seine-Maritime département of the Normandy  region of northern France. It was created on 31 December 1997. Its seat is Goderville. Its area is 145.3 km2, and its population was 15,059 in 2018.

Participants 
The communauté de communes consists of the following 22 communes:

Angerville-Bailleul
Annouville-Vilmesnil
Auberville-la-Renault
Bec-de-Mortagne
Bénarville
Bornambusc
Bréauté
Bretteville-du-Grand-Caux
Daubeuf-Serville
Écrainville
Goderville
Gonfreville-Caillot
Grainville-Ymauville
Houquetot
Manneville-la-Goupil
Mentheville
Saint-Maclou-la-Brière
Saint-Sauveur-d'Émalleville
Sausseuzemare-en-Caux
Tocqueville-les-Murs
Vattetot-sous-Beaumont
Virville

See also
Communes of the Seine-Maritime department

References 

Campagne de Caux
Campagne de Caux